Kylie Rogers (born ) is an American actress, best known for playing the role of Minx Lawrence in The Whispers. She also stars as Anna Beam in Miracles from Heaven. Since 2018, Rogers has a recurring role as the younger version of the main character Beth Dutton in the American television series Yellowstone.

Filmography

Film

Television

References

External links
 
 

2000s births
Living people
21st-century American actresses
American film actresses
American television actresses
American child actresses
Actresses from Dallas
Actresses from Houston
Year of birth missing (living people)
Place of birth missing (living people)